Hürriyet is a unisex given name used in Turkey. It is also used as a surname. People with the name include:

Given name
 Hürriyet Gücer (born 1981), Turkish footballer
 Hürriyet Sırmaçek (1912–1983), Turkish engineer

Surname
 Fatma Kaplan Hürriyet (born 1982), Turkish lawyer and politician

See also
 Hürriyet (disambiguation)

Turkish unisex given names
Turkish-language surnames